Stemphylium vesicarium is a plant pathogen infecting many plants including onion, garlic, asparagus, and pear.

References

External links 
 Index Fungorum
 USDA ARS Fungal Database

Fungal plant pathogens and diseases
Vegetable diseases
Mango tree diseases
Pleosporaceae
Fungi described in 1833